Chinedum "Nedu" Ndukwe  (born March 4, 1985) is a former American football safety. He was drafted by the Cincinnati Bengals in the seventh round of the 2007 NFL Draft. He played college football for the University of Notre Dame. He also played for the Oakland Raiders.

He founded the Cincinnati-based Kingsley + Co., a commercial real estate company.

College career
After graduating from Dublin Coffman High School, Ndukwe went on to start as safety for the University of Notre Dame for his junior and senior seasons. He played in 46 games with 25 starts and made 157 tackles.

During his tenure at Notre Dame, his fellow Dublin Coffman graduate, Brady Quinn, was his roommate. Ndukwe had a double major in Marketing and Psychology.

Professional career

Cincinnati Bengals
Ndukwe was drafted by the Cincinnati Bengals in the seventh round (253rd overall) of the 2007 NFL Draft. Ndukwe made an immediate impact by playing in 14 games and starting two in place of an injured Dexter Jackson at strong safety. Ndukwe finished the season with 35 tackles, two sacks, three interceptions, six pass deflections, a fumble recovery that he returned for a touchdown, and one forced fumble. He finished the season one of four Bengals to log an entry in every statistical column on the defensive stat sheet for the season. Ndukwe missed the second and third games of the season due to a hamstring injury suffered against the Baltimore Ravens. In a December 23 contest against the Cleveland Browns, Ndukwe totaled two interceptions off quarterback Derek Anderson. His first interception was returned 44 yards to the five-yard line, setting up a Bengals' score. His next interception came off of a pass intended for tight end Kellen Winslow that Ndukwe grabbed in the end zone. He also recorded 12 tackles, which was second-best on the team. In a November game against the Ravens, Ndukwe intercepted a Kyle Boller pass in the end zone in the fourth quarter.

In the season finale against the Miami Dolphins, Ndukwe returned a fumble 54 yards for a touchdown that put the Bengals ahead 28-10 in the fourth quarter. After the touchdown, excited commentator Joe Woeste claimed Ndukwe was a future Hall of Famer. He was competing with Dexter Jackson for the starting safety role; however, in 2009 the Bengals cut Jackson, leaving Ndukwe as the starting strong safety.

He became a free agent after the 2010 season.

Oakland Raiders
After rehabbing a knee injury for 10 months, the Oakland Raiders signed Ndukwe on October 18, 2011. He played in two games with one interception before aggravating the original injury, ending his comeback and his season on November 10.

Personal
Ndukwe's name, "Chinedum," means "God is my Guiding Light" in Igbo.

In 2008, Ndukwe attended the Harvard Business School, followed by the Wharton School of Business at the University of Pennsylvania in 2009 for the NFL Business Management Program.

On January 30, 2012, Ndukwe made his voiceover debut, working for NFL Films as the narrator for ESPN's Hey Rookie.

Ndukwe is the youngest of the three sons; his oldest brother Kelechi is Commanding Officer of USS HALSEY who previously served on the Minesweeper Crew SWERVE, based in San Diego, as the Executive Officer and later as Commanding Officer of USS DEVASTATOR in Manama, Bahrain. The middle brother, Ikechukwu, is an offensive tackle in the NFL who is a free agent. The youngest sibling, Ezinne, is earning her masters in public health at the University of Michigan.

References

External links
 Official Web Site of Chinedum Ndukwe

 Notre Dame Fighting Irish bio
 Bengals Player Bio
 Official Blog

1985 births
Living people
People from Dublin, Ohio
People from Powell, Ohio
Players of American football from Ohio
American football safeties
Notre Dame Fighting Irish football players
Cincinnati Bengals players
Oakland Raiders players
Igbo sportspeople
American people of Igbo descent
Sportspeople from Charlottesville, Virginia
Players of American football from Virginia
Players of American football from Cincinnati
American sportspeople of Nigerian descent